Amy Ella Satterthwaite (born 7 October 1986) is a New Zealand former cricketer who played as an all-rounder, batting left-handed and bowling either right-arm medium or off break. She appeared in 145 One Day Internationals and 111 Twenty20 Internationals for New Zealand between 2007 and 2022. She played domestic cricket for Canterbury, Tasmania, Hobart Hurricanes, Melbourne Renegades, Lancashire Thunder, Lancashire and Manchester Originals.

On 26 February 2017, against Australia, she became the first player in WODIs and second overall after Kumar Sangakkara in ODIs to score four consecutive hundreds. In December 2017, she won the inaugural ICC Women's ODI Player of the Year award. In September 2018, Suzie Bates stepped down as captain of New Zealand and was replaced by Satterthwaite.

In July 2020, Satterthwaite was appointed as the vice-captain of the New Zealand women's cricket team, with Sophie Devine appointed as the team's captain on a full-time basis. In September 2020, in the first match of New Zealand's series against Australia, Satterthwaite played in her 100th WT20I. In May 2022, Satterthwaite announced her retirement from international cricket, and from all cricket in February 2023.

Playing career

Domestic and franchise career

Satterthwaite made her debut for Canterbury Magicians at limited overs level in 2003.

In 2007, Satterthwaite became captain of the Magicians, initially on a temporary basis due to regular captain Haidee Tiffen having a virus.

In 2016, Satterthwaite was appointed captain of the Lancashire Thunder in the Women's Cricket Super League. She played in five matches for the Thunder in July and August 2016.

During the 2014–15 season, Satterthwaite played nine matches for the Tasmanian Roar; four times in the Australian Women's Twenty20 Cup and five in the Women's National Cricket League.

Satterthwaite signed for the Hobart Hurricanes ahead of the 2015–16 Women's Big Bash League season. In 2016, she resigned for the Hurricanes for the 2016–17 Women's Big Bash League season. In November 2018, she was named in the Melbourne Renegades' squad for the 2018–19 Women's Big Bash League season.

In April 2022, she was bought by the Manchester Originals for the 2022 season of The Hundred in England. She announced her retirement from all forms of cricket in February 2023. In her final season with Canterbury, she captained them to victory in the 2022–23 Super Smash.

International career
Satterthwaite made her international debut for New Zealand against Australia on 19 July 2007 in a Twenty20 International. She made her One Day International debut two days later, also against Australia.

In August 2007, she took six wickets for seventeen runs against England; this remained  the only six-wicket haul in a women's T20I match until 20 August 2018 when Botsogo Mpedi of Botswana took 6/8.

Starting during the Pakistan's tour to New Zealand in November 2016, and then into the Australian women's team tour of New Zealand in 2017, Satterthwaite became the first woman to score a century in four consecutive innings in ODIs.

Satterthwaite has captained New Zealand twice in One Day International cricket, the first against Ireland in 2010 and the second against Pakistan in 2016.

During the 2017 ICC Women's Cricket World Cup, she equalled the record of Lydia Greenway for taking the most catches in a single Women's Cricket World Cup series(8)

In August 2018, she was awarded a central contract by New Zealand Cricket, following the tours of Ireland and England in the previous months. In October 2018, she was named as captain of New Zealand's squad for the 2018 ICC Women's World Twenty20 tournament in the West Indies. In February 2022, she was named as the vice-captain of New Zealand's team for the 2022 Women's Cricket World Cup in New Zealand.

International centuries

One Day International centuries

Personal life
Satterthwaite was born in Christchurch and grew up in Culverden in north Canterbury. Her father, Michael Satterthwaite, represented Canterbury Country in cricket and is a former chairman of Canterbury Cricket. She states that she grew up with cricket and "had a love for the game from when [she] could walk!" Satterthwaite was for many years office manager for a veterinary practice, and since 2015 has been employed by Canterbury Cricket.

In March 2017, she married fellow international cricketer Lea Tahuhu. In August 2019, Satterthwaite announced that she and Tahuhu were expecting their first child, and was taking a break from cricket. She missed the 2020 ICC Women's T20 World Cup in Australia, but hoped to be in the team's squad for the 2022 Women's Cricket World Cup in New Zealand.

On 13 January 2020, Satterthwaite gave birth to a daughter, Grace Marie Satterthwaite.

References

External links

 
 
 

1986 births
Living people
Cricketers from Christchurch
New Zealand women cricketers
New Zealand women One Day International cricketers
New Zealand women Twenty20 International cricketers
New Zealand women cricket captains
Canterbury Magicians cricketers
Hobart Hurricanes (WBBL) cricketers
Melbourne Renegades (WBBL) cricketers
Tasmanian Tigers (women's cricket) cricketers
Lancashire Thunder cricketers
Lancashire women cricketers
Manchester Originals cricketers
LGBT cricketers
New Zealand LGBT sportspeople
Lesbian sportswomen
21st-century New Zealand LGBT people